April 12 - Eastern Orthodox liturgical calendar - April 14

All fixed commemorations below are observed on April 26 by Eastern Orthodox Churches on the Old Calendar.

For April 13, Orthodox Churches on the Old Calendar commemorate the Saints listed on March 31.

Saints

 Saints Theodosia the Princess (daughter of Emperor Hadrian), and the Eunuch Gerontios (c. 117-138)
 Martyrs Dadas, Quinctillian and Maximus, the Lectors (c. 284-305)  (see also: April 28, August 2)
 Martyr Crescens of Myra in Lycia (3rd century)  (see also: April 15 - Greek)
 Hieromartyr Artemon, priest of Laodicea in Syria (303)  (see also: March 24, April 12 - Greek)
 Martyrs Eleutherius of Persia, and Zoilus, by beheading (4th century)
 Martyr Theodosius, by the sword.
 Martyr Thomais of Alexandria (476)  (see also: April 14 - Greek)
 Saint Martyrius, Patriarch of Jerusalem (486)
 Saint Martin the Confessor, Pope of Rome (655)  (see also: April 14 - Slavic)
 Two Confessor Bishops, who were exiled to the Crimean peninsula together with St. Martin the Confessor, Pope of Rome (ca. 655)  (compare also with: Bishops Sergiy, Pir and Theodor, April 14 - Romanian)
 Venerable martyr Christophoros, of the  Great Lavra of St. Sabbas the Sanctified.

Pre-Schism Western saints

 Saint Ursus, Bishop of Ravenna and Confessor (396)
 Saint Martius, Abbot, of Clermont in Gaul (c. 530)
 Saint Hermenegild, son of the Visigothic King of Spain, Leovigild (586)
 Saint Guinoch of Buchan (Guinoc, Guinochus), a Bishop in Scotland (ca. 838)

Post-Schism Orthodox saints

 Saint Arsenios of Elassonna (Arsenius of Suzdal), Archbishop of Elassona (1625)  (see also: April 29)
 Venerable Herman, Archimandrite, of Svyatogorsk Monastery (1890)
 Saint Anastasia (Duchess Alexandra Petrovna of Oldenburg), nun and foundress of the Holy Protection Convent (Pokrovsky) in Kiev (1900)

New martyrs and confessors

 New Hieromartyr Stephen (Bekh), Bishop of Izhevsk (1933)
 Virgin-martyr Martha Testova (1941)

Other commemorations

 Repose of Archimandrite Herman of Svyatogorsk (1890)
 Translation of the relics (1967) of the Holy New Martyr George of Cyprus (1752)
 Repose of Elder Cosmas of Pantokratoros monastery, Mt. Athos (1970)

Icon gallery

Notes

References

Sources
 April 13 / April 26. Orthodox Calendar (pravoslavie.ru).
 April 26 / April 13. Holy Trinity Russian Orthodox Church (A parish of the Patriarchate of Moscow).
 April 13. OCA - The Lives of the Saints.
 The Autonomous Orthodox Metropolia of Western Europe and the Americas. St. Hilarion Calendar of Saints for the year of our Lord 2004. St. Hilarion Press (Austin, TX). p. 28.
 April 13. Latin Saints of the Orthodox Patriarchate of Rome.
 The Roman Martyrology. Transl. by the Archbishop of Baltimore. Last Edition, According to the Copy Printed at Rome in 1914. Revised Edition, with the Imprimatur of His Eminence Cardinal Gibbons. Baltimore: John Murphy Company, 1916. pp. 104–105.
Greek Sources
 Great Synaxaristes:  13 Απριλιου. Μεγασ Συναξαριστησ.
  Συναξαριστής. 13 Απριλίου. ecclesia.gr. (H Εκκλησια Τησ Ελλαδοσ). 
Russian Sources
  26 апреля (13 апреля). Православная Энциклопедия под редакцией Патриарха Московского и всея Руси Кирилла (электронная версия). (Orthodox Encyclopedia - Pravenc.ru).
  13 апреля (ст.ст.) 26 апреля 2013 (нов. ст.). Русская Православная Церковь Отдел внешних церковных связей.

April in the Eastern Orthodox calendar